Koldo Izagirre Urreaga (born 21 June 1953 in Pasaia, Gipuzkoa) is an innovative Basque writer who has worked in several genres of literature, including poetry, novels, and tales. Izagirre has translated works by classic authors into other languages. He has also written texts, both for young people and adults. In addition, he has produced journal and magazine articles, and written television and film scripts.

In 1978 he founded the literature magazine  with Ramon Saizarbitoria and other writers. In the 1980s he wrote Panpina Ustela with Bernardo Atxaga.

In 1990 he directed the film  and also wrote the script, as he has done for the film . He also wrote some cartoons.

Works

Some essays
 
Itsaso ahantzia ("Forsaken sea"), 1976, Kriseilu.
Oinaze zaharrera ("On the way to the old pain"), 1977, Ustela saila.
Guardasola ahantzia ("Forsaken umbrella"), 1978, Ustela Saila.
Balizko erroten erresuma ("The kingdom of the hypothetical mills"), 1989, Susa.
Non dago Basque harbour? ("Where is Basque Harbour?"), 1997, Susa.
Teilatuko lizarra ("An ashtree over the roof"), 2005, Susa.
Rimmel, 2006, Susa.
Parisen bizi naiz ("I live in Paris"), 2013, Susa.
Autopsiarako frogak ("Evidence for the autopsy"), 2010, Susa.

Novels
Euzkadi merezi zuten ("They deserved Euzkadi"), 1985, Hordago.
Nik ere Germinal! egin gura nuen aldarri ("I also wanted to turn Germinal! into a slogan"), 1998, Elkar.
Agirre zaharraren kartzelaldi berriak ("New prison terms for the old Agirre"), 1999, Elkar.
Egarri egunak portualdean ("Thirst days in the harbour area"), 2011, Susa.

Stories
Metxa esaten dioten agirretar baten ibili herrenak ("The lame walks of an Agirre called Metxa"), 1991, Elkar.
Vladimir, 1996, Erein.
Sua nahi, Mr Churchill? ("May I light it, Mr. Churchill?"), 2005, Susa.

Dictionaries
Euskal Lokuzioak ("Basque expressions"), 1981, Hordago.

Chronicles
Ez duk erraza, konpai ("It ain't easy, compañero"), 1995, Susa.
"Merry Christmas, Panama" esan zuen heriotzak ("'Merry Christmas, Panama', Death said") 1999, Euskaldunon Egunkaria.

Translations

Desertorea (Le deserteur, "The Deserter"), Boris Vian. Armiarma, 2009
Gaueko hegaldia (Vol de nuit, "Night flight"), Antoine de Saint-Exupéry. Igela, 2008
Bi poema ("Two poems"), Wisława Szymborska. 1999, 2008
Hogeita bost poema ("Twenty five poems"), Mahmud Darwish. Transl.: Itxaro Borda / Koldo Izagirre / armiarma.com, 2008
Ulenspiegelen elezaharra, Charles De Coster. Alberdania-Elkar, 2007
Umearen ehiza, Jacques Prevert. Realpolitik, 2006
Sud-Ouestaren argia, Roland Barthes. susa-literatura.com, 2005
Antoloxia homenaxe, 32 poema, Manuel Maria. Fato Cultural Daniel Castelao, 2005
Nazkatutako bluesa, Langston Hughes. Ahalegina, 2004
Eguna garaitu, gaua garaitu, Robert Desnos. Ahalegina, 2004
Nekatua nago, Yehuda Amichai. Ahalegina, 2004
Ni zapatok naute, Felix Leclerc. Itzul.: Itxaro Borda / Koldo Izagirre / Ahalegina, 2004
Iparburuko esploratzailea, Joseph Brodsky. Ahalegina, 2004
Askatasunaren kantua, Banira Giri. Ahalegina, 2004
Lanari lotua, Liam O'Muirthile. Ahalegina, 2004
Ez ezazula uste, Claes Andersson. Ahalegina, 2004
Katu beltza, Ali Prodimja. Ahalegina, 2004
Ireki leihoak, mesedez!, Fakhar Zaman. Ahalegina, 2004
Estrontzio 90, Nazim Hikmet. Ahalegina, 2004
Adoreak, Juan Gelman. Ahalegina, 2004
Hamar poema, Paul Éluard. armiarma.com, 2002
Idi orgaren karranka, Victor Hugo. Elkar, 2002
Heriofuga, Paul Celan. Literatura Unibertsala – Batxilergoa, 2000
Zerua eta itsasoa, Joan Salvat-Papasseit. Vladimir-12, 1999
Gauez ate joka datozenean, Xabier P. Docampo. Elkar, 1996
Mateo falcone eta beste zenbait istorio, Prosper Mérimée. Elkar, 1995
Idazlan hautatuak, Joan Salvat-Papasseit. Pamiela, 1995
Poema antologia, Vladimir Maiakovski. Susa, 1993
Intxixuen artxibotik, Rafael Dieste. Elkar, 1993
Lauretatik lauretara, Manuel Antonio. Itzul.: Iñigo Aranbarri / Koldo Izagirre. Susa, 1992
Ramon Lamoteren gauzak, Paco Martin. Elkar, 1989
Aresti/Ferreiro/Espriu antologia, Salvador Espriu. Erein, 1988
Bazterrak, Uxío Novoneyra. Pamiela, 1988
Zirtzilak: Kristalezko begia, Alfonso Rodríguez Castelao. Susa, 1986
Maiatza zorabiatuaren pastorala, Manuel Maria. Antzerti-72, 1985
Berengela izeneko otarantza baten ibilketak eta biribilketak, Manuel Maria. Antzerti-72, 1985
Kristalezko begia: eskeleto baten oroimenak, Alfonso Rodríguez Castelao. Kriselu, 1976

References

1953 births
Living people
Basque writers